TIS, Tis or Tis may refer to:

Organisations
 Taporoporo'anga Ipukarea Society, an environmental NGO based in the Cook Islands
 TransInvestService (TIS), is a large Ukrainian private terminal operator and stevedore operating in the Port of Yuzhny
 Transparency International Slovakia, an anti-corruption non-governmental organization
 Trusted Information Systems, a former computer security research and development company
 The International School of Macao, a Canadian international school in Macao
 The International School, Karachi, a private school in Karachi, Sindh, Pakistan

Places
Tis (Havlíčkův Brod District), a municipality and village in the Czech Republic
Tis u Blatna, a municipality and village in the Czech Republic
Tis, a village and part of Janov (Rychnov nad Kněžnou District) in the Czech Republic
Tis, Iran, a village

Other uses
Tin Shui Wai station (MTR station code TIS), Hong Kong 
Travelers' information station, providing information by radio to motorists
Truth in sentencing, policies on criminal sentencing
'Tis, a 1999 memoir by Frank McCourt
Tis, In molecular biology and genetics translation initiation site
Triisopropylsilane, or TIS, a hydrosilane
Technological innovation system
Tensilica Instruction Extension, a proprietary language for customizing Tensilica's Xtensa processors

See also
 'Tis the Season (disambiguation)